Victor Henry Webster (1905–1980) was an Australian politician and medical officer. Trained in Melbourne and Perth, he moved to Tennant Creek. He was a member of the Northern Territory Legislative Council for Tennant Creek from 1947 to 1950. He published a book, Bush Medicine, in 1948.

References

1905 births
1980 deaths
Politicians from Melbourne
Members of the Northern Territory Legislative Council
20th-century Australian politicians